Out California Way is a 1946 American Western musical film directed by Lesley Selander for Republic Pictures. It starred Monte Hale, Lorna Gray (billed as Adrian Booth) and Robert Blake. Roy Rogers and Dale Evans made cameo appearances. The film was the first feature to be shot in Trucolor.

Plot
Unemployed Monte Hale meets Gloria McCoy and her brother Danny who is trying to get his horse, Pardner, into films. Monte finds that Pardner will dance while he sings and they take their act to a studio which gives them both parts in a Western musical. Monte has a jealous rival called Rod Mason who causes an explosion while Monte and Pardner are shooting a scene. The horse is scared and will no longer perform. After Monte wins a fistfight with his rival, Roy Rogers and Dale Evans arrive on set with Trigger. They sing a song with Trigger dancing and this inspires Pardner to dance again.

Cast

 Monte Hale as Monte
 Lorna Gray as Gloria McCoy (billed as Adrian Booth)
 Robert Blake as  Danny McCoy
 John Dehner as Rod Mason
 Nolan Leary as George Sheridan
 Fred Graham as Ace Hanlon
 Tom London as Johnny
 Edward Keane as E. J. Pearson
 Robert J. Wilke as Nate

Cameos (as themselves) 
 Roy Rogers
 Dale Evans
 Don 'Red' Barry
 Allan Lane
 Jimmy Starr
 Foy Willing and the Riders of the Purple Sage
 St Luke's Episcopal Church Choristers

References

External links
 

1946 films
1946 Western (genre) films
American Western (genre) films
1940s English-language films
Republic Pictures films
Trucolor films
Films directed by Lesley Selander
1940s American films